Lisa Russ Spaar is a contemporary American poet, professor, and essayist. 
She is currently a professor of English and Creative Writing at the University of Virginia and the director of the Area Program in Poetry Writing. She is the author of numerous books of poetry, most recently Vanitas, Rough: Poems and Satin Cash: Poems. Her latest collection, Orexia, was published by Persea Books in 2017. Her poem, Temple Gaudete, published in IMAGE Journal, won a 2016 Pushcart Prize.

Spaar has also edited several anthologies, including All That Mighty Heart: London Poems, which Billy Collins says "gathers [a] mighty swirl of poetry into a gorgeous volume whose variety and heft rival the city itself— its smoke, roar, and flow."

Education

Spaar graduated summa cum laude from the University of Virginia with a B.A. in 1978. Two years later, in 1980, she returned to the University of Virginia to complete her education with an M.F.A. in Creative Writing (Poetry).

Poetry

Spaar's books of poetry include Orexia  (2017), Vanitas, Rough (2012), Satin Cash: Poems 2008, Blue Venus (2004), and Glass Town (1999), for which she won the Rona Jaffe Award for Emerging Women Writers in 2000.

Spaar's poems have been widely published in many places, including Boston Review, Poetry, Ploughshares, The Paris Review, SLATE, The Virginia Quarterly Review, IMAGE Journal, Plume, The Alabama Literary Review, Blackbird, Spirituality & Health, Cerise Press, Connotations Press, Waxwing, TUBA, 32 Poems, Shenandoah, TriQuarterly, The Kenyon Review, The Yale Review, Denver Quarterly, Quarterly West, Verse, Poetry East, Drunken Boat, The Hollins Critic, The Southwest Review, Crazyhorse, The Laurel Review, Bellingham Review, College English, Meridian, Brilliant Corners, The Atlanta Review, The Southern Poetry Review, Poet Lore, Free Verse, Carolina Quarterly,  American Literary Review, 64, Indiana Review, Smartish Pace, & elsewhere.

Prose

Currently, Spaar writes a series of articles entitled "Second Acts:  A Second Look at Second Books of Poetry," published through the Los Angeles Review of Books.

Spaar has contributed more than 70 articles to the Chronicle of Higher Education, including the Monday's Poem series and the Spaar on Poetry series.

Teaching

Spaar has received numerous teaching honors and awards.

Awards
 2011 Carole Weinstein Poetry Prize
 2009/2010 Guggenheim Fellowship
 2001 Emily Clark Balch Award of the Virginia Quarterly Review
 2000 Rona Jaffe Foundation Writers' Award
 1997 Finalist, National Poetry Series
 1996 Virginia Commission for the Arts Individual Artists Award
 1978 Academy of American Poets Prize - University of Virginia
 1980 Hoyns Fellowship in Poetry - University of Virginia

Bibliography
 
 
 Blind Boy on Skates, Trilobite Chapbooks of the University of Northern Texas Press, 1987.
 
 
 Blue Venus: Poems, Persea Books, 2004.
The Land of Wandering, University of Virginia Press, 2005
 
 

Monticello in Mind: Fifty Contemporary Poets on Jefferson, University of Virginia Press, 2016

More Truly & More Strange:  100 Contemporary Self-Portrait Poems, Persea Books, 2020
Madrigalia: New and Selected Poems, Persea Books, 2021
Paradise Close,Persea Books, 2022

Anthologies

Criticism
"God-Hunger Redux", Virginia Quarterly Review, Winter 2009

List of poems

References

Year of birth missing (living people)
Living people
University of Virginia alumni
University of Virginia faculty
American women poets
Rona Jaffe Foundation Writers' Award winners
American women academics
20th-century American poets
20th-century American women writers
21st-century American poets
21st-century American women writers